Schepke is a German surname that may refer to
Charles S. Schepke (1878–1933), United States Navy gunner
Frank Schepke (1935–2017), German rower 
Joachim Schepke (1912–1941), German U-boat commander 
Kraft Schepke (born 1934), German rower, brother of Frank
Matt Schepke (born 1985), American ice hockey player 

German-language surnames